Burnett Park in Fort Worth, Texas is a park designed around twenty four squares.

Original design and renovation
The park was originally laid out by George E. Kessler. It was designed in 1984 for Anne Burnett, in honor of her mother and her grandfather. The Tandy Foundation sponsored the rehabilitation of this urban park to encourage the continuing revitalization of downtown Fort Worth.

Together with the nearby sculpture garden plaza designed by Isamu Noguchi, Burnett Park now forms an important gateway to the city from the west. The park has been renovated and updated several times over the decades.

See also
 Anne Windfohr Marion#Philanthropy
 Botanical Research Institute of Texas 
 Fort Worth Botanic Garden
 Noguchi Museum

References

External links
https://web.archive.org/web/20141220184858/http://www.dfwi.org/what-we-offer/attractions/parks/124-Burnett-Park
https://web.archive.org/web/20141220180306/http://www.folaweb.com/burnett-park.html
http://www.pwpla.com/projects/burnett-park/&details

Parks in Fort Worth, Texas